Peter Cheung Kwok-che (born 8 November 1951) is a former member of the Legislative Council of Hong Kong (Functional constituency, Social Welfare), with the Labour Party.

He is a social worker at Hong Kong Caritas Service for Young People and President of the Hong Kong Social Workers General Union. He beat Tik Chi Yuen to win his seat of the functional constituency (social welfare) in the 2008 Legislative Council election and held the seat until retiring at the 2016 election.

References

1951 births
Living people
Hong Kong social workers
Hong Kong Association for Democracy and People's Livelihood politicians
Alumni of King's College, Hong Kong
Labour Party (Hong Kong) politicians
HK LegCo Members 2008–2012
HK LegCo Members 2012–2016
Members of the Election Committee of Hong Kong, 2007–2012
Members of the Election Committee of Hong Kong, 2017–2021